Swiss French ( or ) is the variety of French spoken in the French-speaking area of Switzerland known as Romandy. French is one of the four official languages of Switzerland, the others being German, Italian, and Romansch. In 2020, around 2 million people in the country (22.8% of the population) spoke French as their primary language, and French was the most frequently used language for 28% of the labour market.
 
The French spoken in Switzerland is very similar to that of France or Belgium. The differences between the French of Switzerland and of France are mostly lexical, influenced by local substrate languages. This contrasts with the differences between Standard German and Swiss German, which are largely mutually unintelligible.

Swiss French is characterized by some terms adopted from Arpitan, which was formerly spoken widely across the alpine communities of Romandy, but has far fewer speakers today. In addition, some expressions have been borrowed from both Swiss and Standard German. Although a standard form of French is taught in schools and used in the government, the media and business, there is no uniform vernacular form of French among the different cantons of Switzerland. For example, some German terms in regions bordering German-speaking communities are completely unused in the area around Geneva, located near the border with France.

Phonology

The nasal vowels are pronounced like in France.  → ,  → ,  → .
There is a stronger distinction between long and short vowels in Switzerland:
As a result, almost all feminine adjectives are still phonetically distinct from their masculine counterparts, unlike in France and Quebec.
 Speakers also won't differentiate masculine from feminine adjectives phonetically, including in final closed syllables, although the spelling only partially bears out this occurrence, e.g.  is pronounced , whilst the feminine  is pronounced .

Examples of words that differ between Switzerland and France

See also 
Demographics of Switzerland
Linguistic geography of Switzerland
Swiss German
Swiss Italian

Notes and references

External links 
 French (Swiss) DoReCo corpus compiled by Mathieu Avanzi, Marie-José Béguelin, Gilles Corminboeuf, Federica Diémoz and Laure Anne Johnsen. Audio recordings of narrative texts with transcriptions time-aligned at the phone level, translations, and time-aligned morphological annotations.

French language
Languages of Switzerland
French dialects
National dialects of French